Cinnamomum osmophloeum, commonly known as pseudocinnamomum or indigenous cinnamon, is a medium-sized evergreen tree in the genus Cinnamomum. It is native to broad-leaved forests of central and northern Taiwan.

Cinnamaldehyde, an essential oil extracted from C. osmophloeum, has numerous commercial uses.  Also, it is a xanthine oxidase inhibitor, hence a potential drug for treatment of hyperuricemia and related medical conditions including gout.

Ethnobotany application 

Cinnamomum osmophloeum can treat 

 Drinking cold drinks often causes diarrhea
 Indigestion
 Colds
 Help smooth blood circulation
 Menstrual irregularities
 Boost mind

It is also the main ingredient of Wu jia pi wine, and it can also be used to make cinnamon tea.

One of the aborigines of Taiwan, the Tsou called the soil Cinnamomum osmophloeum as Nigi.

Modern application 
Cinnamomum osmophloeum is recognized as a good substitute for cinnamon, and the main components of its essential oil are cinnamaldehyde and coumarin.

Compared with cinnamon, C. osmophloeum is even better. In addition to extracting essential oils from the bark, the branches and leaves of C. osmophloeum can also extract essential oils.

And the yield of essential oils extracted from branches and leaves is 5 times higher than that of bark, so there is no need to peel off the bark and felling trees. As long as the leaves of C. osmophloeum are collected, the essential oil can be refined, and it can be harvested year after year. Potential to become an excellent non-wood forest product.

See also
Cinnamon
Cinnamomum aromaticum (Cassia)
Japanese cinnamon
Malabathrum
Saigon cinnamon

References

External links

osmophloeum
Endemic flora of Taiwan
Spices
Trees of Taiwan
Vulnerable flora of Asia
Xanthine oxidase inhibitors